Phryganopteryx is a genus of Madagascan moths in the monotypic subtribe Phryganopterygina of the family Erebidae. The genus was erected by Max Saalmüller in 1884. The type species of this genus is Phryganopteryx strigilata Saalmüller, 1878.

Species
 Phryganopteryx convergens Toulgoët, 1958
 Phryganopteryx formosa Toulgoët, 1958
 Phryganopteryx griveaudi Toulgoët, 1958
 Phryganopteryx incerta Toulgoët, 1972
 Phryganopteryx inexpectata Rothschild, 1931
 Phryganopteryx intermedia Toulgoët, 1965
 Phryganopteryx lemairei Toulgoët, 1973
 Phryganopteryx nebulosa Toulgoët, 1958
 Phryganopteryx occidentalis Toulgoët, 1958
 Phryganopteryx pauliani Toulgoët, 1971
 Phryganopteryx perineti Rothschild, 1933
 Phryganopteryx postexcisa Rothschild, 1935
 Phryganopteryx rectangulata Kenrick, 1914
 Phryganopteryx rothschildi Toulgoët, 1958
 Phryganopteryx saalmuelleri Rothschild, 1924
 Phryganopteryx sogai Toulgoët, 1958
 Phryganopteryx strigilata Saalmüller, 1878
 Phryganopteryx triangularis Toulgoët, 1958
 Phryganopteryx viettei Toulgoët, 1961
 Phryganopteryx watsoni Toulgoët, 1977

References
 
 

Phryganopterygina
Moth genera
Taxa named by Max Saalmüller